Hullabaloo is the third and final studio album released by Liverpool-based indie dance group the Farm. It was released on the Sire Records label in 1994 and was not critically well received.

Track listing
All songs written by Peter Hooton, except where noted.
"Messiah" – 4:26
"Shake Some Action" (Cyril Jordan, Chris Wilson) – 4:05
"Comfort" – 4:52
"The Man Who Cried" – 5:59
"Hateful" – 4:28
"Golden Vision" – 5:06
"To the Ages" – 4:19
"All American World" – 4:36
"Distant Voices" – 5:43
"Echoes" (Hooton, Steve Grimes) – 2:30

References

External links
Cover art

1994 albums
The Farm (British band) albums
Sire Records albums